Cássio Fernando Scheid (born 3 January 1994) is a Brazilian professional footballer who plays for Thai League 1 club BG Pathum United as a centre back.

Professional career
Scheid began his career in the amateur division of Brazil, before joining Farense in 2016. Scheid made his professional debut with Farense in a 0-0 Taça da Liga penalty shootout win over F.C. Penafiel on 21 July 2018. Scheid captained Farense as they were promoted into the Primeira Liga at the end of the 2019-20 season.

Honours

Club
BG Pathum United
 Thailand Champions Cup: 2022

References

External links

MaisFutebol Profile

1994 births
Living people
Sportspeople from Rio Grande do Sul
Brazilian footballers
Association football defenders
Primeira Liga players
Liga Portugal 2 players
Campeonato de Portugal (league) players
Clube Atlético Juventus players
São Carlos Futebol Clube players
S.C. Farense players
Cassio Scheid
Cassio Scheid
Brazilian expatriate footballers
Brazilian expatriates in Portugal
Expatriate footballers in Portugal